Lynn Ruane (born 20 October 1984) is an Irish politician who has served as an independent Senator for the Dublin University constituency in Seanad Éireann since April 2016. She was the President of the Trinity College Dublin Students' Union from 2015 to 2016.

Early life
Ruane grew up in Tallaght; she became a single mother and left school aged 15.  After returning to education via An Cosán, she studied addiction and helped to develop local services for drug users.

University politics
In 2012, she completed a foundation programme to allow access to a degree programme at Trinity College Dublin (TCD), and studied politics and philosophy. Having spent a year representing student parents on the Trinity College Dublin Students' Union executive, she was elected as the union's president on 12 February 2015, which gained national attention. As president, she was active in the fossil fuel divestment campaign at TCD, and the campaign to repeal the Eighth Amendment.

National politics
In December 2015, Ruane announced her intention to contest the 2016 Seanad election in the Dublin University constituency as an independent candidate. She was elected to represent Trinity graduates in the Oireachtas on the 15th and final count, unseating incumbent Sean Barrett. She was re-elected at the 2020 Seanad election, reaching the quota on the eighth count.

In the 25th Seanad, Ruane sits with the Civil Engagement group; an alliance of independent senators seeking to bring civil society expertise and experience into the Oireachtas.

In May 2017, Ruane introduced the Controlled Drugs and Harm Reduction Bill to the Seanad which proposed removing criminal sanctions for minor drug possession. In February 2019, Ruane introduced the Criminal Justice (Rehabilitative Periods) Bill to the Seanad which proposed expanding access to spent convictions, where it passed unanimously. She has subsequently been referred to as "a long-time campaigner for drug reform in Ireland." She and Green Party TD Neasa Hourigan have called for a citizens' assembly on drugs.

She was vice-chair of the special Joint Oireachtas Committee on the Eighth Amendment, which was established to examine the repeal of Ireland's constitutional ban on abortion and recommend the legal grounds to access an abortion in Ireland.

Miriam Lord of The Irish Times named Ruane her 2016 Senator of the Year.

Personal life
In 2016, Ruane played a juror on the TV3 historical courtroom drama Trial of the Century.

In September 2018, Ruane published a memoir entitled People Like Me. The memoir reached number one on the Irish paperback non-fiction charts and won the 2018 An Post Irish Book Award for best non-fiction. She was also a contributor to the collection of memoirs and essays called The 32: An Anthology of Irish Working-Class Voices.

Ruane's daughter Jordanne Jones is a DFCC award-winning and IFTA nominated actress.

Bibliography
People Like Me (Gill Books, published September 2018)

References

External links

Official website

1984 births
Living people
Alumni of Trinity College Dublin
Drug policy reform activists
Independent members of Seanad Éireann
Members of the 25th Seanad
Members of the 26th Seanad
21st-century women members of Seanad Éireann
Members of Seanad Éireann for Dublin University
People from South Dublin (county)